Kenneth Brampton (died 21 June 1942) was an Australian actor, writer and director.

He was an actor in England before coming to Australia.

He later ran an acting school.

Filmography
Robbery Under Arms (1920) – actor, director
The Dingo (1923) – director, writer
The Hayseeds (1933) – actor
Splendid Fellows (1934) – writer
Uncivilised (1936) – actor
Typhoon Treasure (1938) – actor

References

External links
Kenneth Brampton at National Film and Sound Archive
Kenneth Brampton Australian theatre credits at AusStage

Australian male film actors
Australian male stage actors
Australian film directors
Year of birth missing
1942 deaths